North British is an adjective used as an alternative to "Scottish", it may also refer to northern regions of England 

North British may also refer to:
North British Academy of Arts
North British Distillery
North British Locomotive Company
North British Railway
North British Hotel - now known as The Balmoral Hotel.

See also

North Britain